Petre Prličko (birth name Petar Parličkov; 13 March 1907 in Veles, Kosovo Vilayet, Ottoman Empire  – 16 November 1995, Skopje, Republic of Macedonia) was a Macedonian actor. According to the periodical Razgledi, he was a "legend of Macedonian theater".

Biography
Petre Prličko was born on 13 March 1907 in Veles, as Petar Parličkov. His father Dime Parličkov was a Macedonian Bulgarian IMORO revolutionary and activist.

He began his career with travelling theaters and in 1931, ended up forming his own theater called "Boem." In 1939 he entered the National Theater in Skopje. During WW2, he became an actor in the Skopje's National Theater, which was formed by the Bulgarian authorities, while Vardar Macedonia was under the Kingdom of Bulgaria. Then he joined the partisan's theater called "Kočo Racin" in 1944, which later became the Macedonian National Theater.

He made his film debut in Frosina.

For his role as "Mandana" in the film Miss Stone, he received the Golden Arena award for Best Actor.

While he was a native of Veles, he died in Skopje in 1995.

Selected filmography
 Frosina (1952)
 Miss Stone (1958)
 Macedonian Blood Wedding (1967)

Gallery

References

External links
 

1907 births
1995 deaths
People from Veles, North Macedonia
People from Kosovo vilayet
Macedonian male stage actors
Macedonian people of Bulgarian descent
Yugoslav male stage actors
20th-century Macedonian male actors
Golden Arena winners